Eric García Orive (born 18 July 1993), simply known as Eric, is a Spanish footballer who plays for Casalarreina CF as a midfielder.

Club career
Eric made his senior debut with CD Mirandés' reserve team in the 2013–14 season, in the regional leagues. On 9 September 2015, he made his first team debut, starting in a 1–2 Copa del Rey home loss against CA Osasuna.

Eric left Mirandés in September 2016, and joined Casalarreina CF in Tercera División. In July 2018, despite suffering relegation, he renewed his contract with the club.

References

External links

1993 births
Living people
People from Miranda de Ebro
Sportspeople from the Province of Burgos
Spanish footballers
Footballers from Castile and León
Association football midfielders
Tercera División players
Tercera Federación players
Divisiones Regionales de Fútbol players
CD Mirandés B players
CD Mirandés footballers